Róbert Nagy (born 28 April 1967) is a Hungarian former motorcycle speedway rider who was a member of Hungary's national team. He is also a four times Hungarian national champion.

References

See also 
 Hungary national speedway team

1967 births
Living people
Hungarian speedway riders
Sportspeople from Szeged